Diego Vicente Bri Carrazoni (born 12 September 2002) is a Spanish professional footballer who plays as a winger for Atlético Madrid B.

Club career
Born in Elche, Alicante, Valencian Community, Bri joined Elche CF's youth setup in 2016, from CF Celtic Elche. On 2 December 2018, aged just 17, he made his senior debut with the reserves by coming on as a half-time substitute in a 0–3 Tercera División away loss against Vilamarxant CF.

Bri made his professional debut with the Franjiverdes on 12 June 2020, replacing Omenuke Mfulu in a 1–1 home draw against Extremadura UD in the Segunda División championship. He scored his first senior goal on 29 November, netting the B's third in a 3–1 home win against Crevillente Deportivo.

On 24 June 2022, Bri signed a four-year contract with Atlético Madrid, being initially assigned to the reserves in Segunda División RFEF.

Personal life
Bri's father José was also a footballer, but only played amateur football during his entire career.

References

External links
 
 
 

2002 births
Living people
Footballers from Elche
Spanish footballers
Association football wingers
Segunda División players
Tercera División players
Tercera Federación players
Elche CF Ilicitano footballers
Elche CF players
Atlético Madrid B players